Hatamuniguda is an underdeveloped village of Rayagada district, Odisha, India - 765020. The village is 43 km far from its district main city Rayagada. Hatamuniguda is 258 km far from its state main city Bhubaneswar.

Schools 
 Ramakrishna Mission School, a CBSE affiliated English Medium School for poor tribal boys of underdeveloped districts of south west Odisha. 
Hatamuniguda G.T.O.U.P. School
S.R.C.S High school
Santi sishu Mandir
Muniguda Arts College
Bissam Cuttack Science College is the nearest Science College.

References 

Villages in Rayagada district